Dr Frank Ralph Batchelor (1931 – 24 May 2021), known as Ralph, was a British biochemist and businessman.

He obtained a research post at Beecham Research Laboratories, in Betchworth in 1956.

Along with Peter Doyle, George Rolinson and John Nayler, he was part of the team at Betchworth that discovered and synthesised new penicillins. A Royal Society of Chemistry blue plaque now marks this discovery.

In 1970 he was given a managerial position. From 1978 he was a Director of Beecham Pharmaceuticals, retiring in 1989.

He received the Addingham Medal by the City of Leeds in 1966 and the Royal Society's Mullard Medal in 1971, with others, "in recognition of their contributions to the development of the semisynthetic penicillins".

His notebook, including early chromatograms showing the presence of 6-APA, are in the collection of the Science Museum in London.

Notable works

References

External links 
 

Place of birth missing
1931 births
2021 deaths
British biochemists
British pharmacologists
British corporate directors